Hal Russell  (born Harold Russell Luttenbacher, August 28, 1926 – September 5, 1992) was an American free jazz composer, band leader and multi-instrumentalist who performed mainly on saxophone and drums but occasionally on trumpet or vibraphone. Russel's fiery music was marked by significant humor, not unlike much of Dutch drummer Han Bennink's output. His music was so accessible that People magazine hailed The Finnish Swiss Tour on ECM as one of its top 5 albums of the year. Russell set the table for the free improv and free jazz scene which exploded later in the 1990s in Chicago.

Biography
Born in Detroit, Michigan, United States, and raised in Chicago, Illinois, from the eighth grade, Russell began playing drums at age four, but majored in trumpet at college; he subsequently drummed in several big bands, including those of Woody Herman and Boyd Raeburn.

As with many young players in the mid-1940s, Russell's life was irreversibly changed by bebop. In the 1950s he worked with musicians including Miles Davis, Billie Holiday, Sonny Rollins, John Coltrane, and Duke Ellington. He succumbed to drugs and was a heroin addict for ten years. In 1959, he joined the Joe Daley Trio, whose Newport' 1963, which was mostly studio material, was reputedly one of the earliest free jazz records.

In the early 1970s, Russell was the regular percussionist for the band at the suburban Chicago Candlelight Dinner Playhouse. Here he played mostly drums, but occasionally vibes and keyboards. At the same time he would host many young jazz musicians for jam sessions at his home, or in Chicago nightclubs.

In 1979, Russell formed the NRG Ensemble, which for most of its existence featured saxophonist Mars Williams, multi-instrumentalist Brian Sandstrom, and percussionist Steve Hunt, among others. At this time he starting playing tenor saxophone, soprano saxophone and trumpet, in addition to drums and vibes. Russell finally issued his first album in 1981 for the Nessa label. In the late 1980s, the group began playing frequently in Europe, and began recording for ECM with The Finnish/Swiss Tour. Russell led the NRG Ensemble until his death.

In addition to the NRG Ensemble, Russell always maintained several auxiliary bands, a partnership with pianist Joel Futterman, the rock-oriented trio NRG 3 with Ed Ludwig on drums and Noel Kupersmith on bass, and The Flying Luttenbachers with Chad Organ on tenor sax and Weasel Walter on drums.

Cited by some as a missing link between the AACM and later Chicago free jazz, Russell was experiencing greater public awareness before his death. Just after completing the semi-autobiographical album The Hal Russell Story, Russell died of a heart attack in September 1992.

Discography
 Elixir (Atavistic, 1979, issued 2001)
 NRG Ensemble (Nessa, 1981) – with NRG Ensemble
 Eftsoons (Nessa, 1981) – with Mars Williams
 Generation (Nessa, 1982) – with NRG Ensemble & Charles Tyler 
 Conserving NRG (Principally Jazz, 1984) – with NRG Ensemble
 Hal on Earth (Abduction, 1989) – with NRG Ensemble
 The Finnish/Swiss Tour (ECM, 1991) – with NRG Ensemble
 Albert's Lullaby (Southport, 1991, issued 2000) - with Michael Staron
 Naked Colours (Silkheart, 1991 [1994]) – with Joel Futterman
 Hal's Bells (ECM, 1992)
 The Hal Russell Story (ECM, 1993) – with NRG Ensemble
With The Flying Luttenbachers
Destructo Noise Explosion!: Live at WNUR 2-6-92 (ugEXPLODE, 1992)

References

1926 births
1992 deaths
Avant-garde jazz musicians
American jazz drummers
American jazz saxophonists
American male saxophonists
American jazz trumpeters
American male trumpeters
American jazz vibraphonists
20th-century American drummers
American male drummers
20th-century American saxophonists
20th-century trumpeters
The Flying Luttenbachers members
20th-century American male musicians
American male jazz musicians
NRG Ensemble members